Eileen Strempel is an operatic soprano, author, higher education policy expert, and academic from Syracuse, New York, who is currently inaugural dean of the UCLA Herb Alpert School of Music. Strempel’s scholarly work advocates for college transfer students—and both access to and support for higher education—and the works of historically underrepresented composers.

Background and education
A trained vocalist, Strempel received her bachelor’s degree in music from the Eastman School of Music and her master’s degree and doctorate in music from Indiana University, where she completed a dissertation entitled “The Gendered Salon in Late Nineteenth-century Paris: The Works of Marie Grandval.”

Career
Strempel was appointed inaugural dean of the UCLA Herb Alpert School of Music in 2019. Prior to joining UCLA, she served as the senior vice provost for academic affairs at the University of Cincinnati. She also held a variety of roles at Syracuse University over a seventeen-year span, including Assistant Vice President for Academic Advancement. During her time at Syracuse, she was also awarded a Kauffman Foundation eProfessorship and an American Council on Education fellowship, which she served at Colgate University.

As a scholar, Strempel’s focus is on the music of women composers. Her work includes recordings, commissions, articles, and edited volumes that examine the political, social, and musical contexts of female composers. She has been published in Classical Singer magazine; Journal of Singing; Reader's Guide to Music: History, Criticism, Theory; Journal of the International Alliance for Women in Music; and Teaching Music.

Strempel has also published extensively on higher education. With Stephen J. Handel, she is the co-author of Beyond Free College: Making Higher Education Work for 21st Century Students, a book focused on higher education public policy. This work is a follow up to their co-edited, two-volume set, Transfer and Transformation: Fostering Transfer Student Success.

As a performer, Strempel has appeared with the Bolshoi Opera, Wolf Trap Opera and Opera Theatre St. Louis, as well as with the Chautauqua, Skaneateles and Berkeley Early Music festivals. Her roles included Violetta in La Traviata, Gilda in Rigoletto and the title role in Lucia di Lammermoor. She has been featured on eight recordings, including love lies bleeding: songs by Libby Larsen, prepared with the composer.

Personal life
Strempel is married to musicologist Stephen Meyer and has two sons.

Publications
Beyond Free College: Making Higher Education Work for 21st Century Students. Co-author with Stephen Handel. Rowman & Littlefield Press, 2021. 
Transition and Transformation: New Research Fostering Transfer Student Success. Co-editor with Stephen Handel. University Press of North Georgia, 2018. 
Transition and Transformation: Fostering Transfer Student Success. Co-editor with Stephen Handel. University Press of North Georgia, 2016.

References

Sources
Dennison, Leah, "Poetry in Motion", Syracuse New Times, Mar 24, 2010
Jahier, Josephine and Swift, Eileen, "Have Voice, Will Travel", Newsday, September 20, 1992, p. 3
Kaufman, Marjorie, "Soprano Excites the World's Opera Stages", The New York Times, May 2, 1993
Syracuse University, Department of Art & Music Histories, Eileen Strempel

American operatic sopranos
Living people
Musicians from Syracuse, New York
Eastman School of Music alumni
Indiana University alumni
Indiana University faculty
Syracuse University faculty
Year of birth missing (living people)
Classical musicians from New York (state)
American women academics
21st-century American women